Christopher Harris (1590–November 1623) of Lanrest in the parish of Liskeard in Cornwall, was a Member of Parliament for West Looe in Cornwall (1621). He should not be confused with his great-uncle Christopher Harris (c.1553-1625) of Radford in the parish of Plymstock in Devon, MP for Plymouth in 1584, whose heir apparent he was.

Origins
He was the eldest son and heir of John Harris (1564- June 1623) of Lanrest, Recorder of the Borough of West Looe in Cornwall and MP for West Looe in Cornwall in 1614,  by his wife Joane Harte, daughter and sole heiress of Robert Harte of Plimston in the parish of Stoke Climsland in Cornwall.

Career
He matriculated at  Exeter College, Oxford on 15 November 1605, aged 15 and was awarded BA on 7 July 1608 and MA on 2 July 1611. He was a law student at Lincoln's Inn in 1611.  In 1621 he was elected Member of Parliament for West Looe in Cornwall.

Marriage
The marriage was without progeny.

Death, burial & succession 
Harris died at the age of 33 and was buried at Plymstock on 27 November 1623. He was succeeded by his younger brother John Harris (c.1596-1648), four times elected MP for Liskeard, who also inherited the estates of their great-uncle Sir Christopher Harris (c.1553-1625), MP for Plymouth in 1584, of Radford in the parish of Plymstock in Devon.

References

1590 births
1623 deaths
Members of the pre-1707 English Parliament for constituencies in Cornwall
Alumni of Exeter College, Oxford
Members of Lincoln's Inn
Place of birth missing
English MPs 1621–1622